Szreniawa  is a village in the administrative district of Gmina Komorniki, within Poznań County, Greater Poland Voivodeship, in west-central Poland.

The village has a population of 810. It is the site of an open-air agricultural museum, the National Museum of Agriculture in Szreniawa, which also administers five branch museums in the Poznań area.

References

External links

Villages in Poznań County